Carinodrillia pylonia is an extinct species of sea snail, a marine gastropod mollusk in the family Pseudomelatomidae, the turrids and allies.

Distribution
This extinct species was found in Quaternary strata of Florida, USA and in Pliocene strata of Mexico; age range: 2.588 to 0.781 Ma

References

 Fargo, W. G., Pliocene Mollusca of Southern Florida. Part II. The Pliocene Turridae of Saint Petersburg, Florida Monographs of the Academy of Natural Sciences of Philadelphia 18 365–409, pls. 16–24, 1953
 M. C. Perrilliat and P. Flores-Guerrero. 2011. Moluscos de la Formación Agueguexquite (Plioceno inferior) de Coatzacoalcos, Veracruz, México. Revista Mexicana de Ciencias Geológicas 28(3):379–397

External links
 Worldwide Mollusc Species Data Base : Carinodrillia pylonia

pylonia
Gastropods described in 1953